The 2008 World Series was the championship series of Major League Baseball's (MLB) 2008 season. The 104th edition of the World Series, it was a best-of-seven playoff between the National League (NL) champion Philadelphia Phillies and the American League (AL) champion Tampa Bay Rays; the Phillies won the series, four games to one. The 2008 World Series is notable because it is the only World Series to involve a mid-game postponement and resumption (two days later).

The Series began on Wednesday, October 22, and (after weather delays had postponed the end of Game 5) concluded the following Wednesday, October 29. The AL's 4–3 win in the 2008 All-Star Game gave the Rays home field advantage for the series, meaning no more than three games would be played at Citizens Bank Park (the Phillies' home ballpark). The Phillies won their second championship in their 126-year history to bring the city of Philadelphia its first championship in 25 years (since the 1983 NBA Finals). This was the first postseason series lost by an MLB team based in the state of Florida; previously, the Rays and Florida Marlins were 8–0 in post-season series. Additionally, both the Phillies' World Series wins have come against a team making their World Series debut (in 1980, they beat the Kansas City Royals).

The Phillies advanced to the World Series after defeating the Milwaukee Brewers and the Los Angeles Dodgers in the NL's Divisional Series and Championship Series, respectively. The team won its position in the playoffs after its second consecutive NL East division title. This was the Phillies' first World Series appearance in fifteen years. The Tampa Bay Rays advanced to the World Series after defeating the Chicago White Sox and the Boston Red Sox, the 2007 World Series champion, in the AL's Division Series and 2008 American League Championship Series.

Teams

Philadelphia Phillies

Philadelphia opened the season by posting a winning record in the opening month of April. The team scored 60 runs over a five-game span in late May and went 14–4 into the beginning of June. The team lost 9 of 11 games to end June, but came out of the All-Star break with a 9–6 record following the midseason hiatus. The Phillies posted the best road record in the National League, at 44–37. Philadelphia traded sweeps with the Los Angeles Dodgers in August and went 13–3 in their last 16 games, to win the National League East title for the second consecutive season. The second-seeded Phillies defeated the Milwaukee Brewers in the Division Series, 3–1, and the Dodgers in the Championship Series, 4–1, to book their place in the 2008 Fall Classic. This was the Phillies' first World Series appearance in fifteen years.

Tampa Bay Rays

The Tampa Bay Rays also began the season (their first after dropping the "Devil" from their name) with a winning record in the opening month of April. The Rays became the first team since 1903 to have the league's best record on Memorial Day (the last Monday in May) after finishing in last place the previous season. The team went 16–10 in June, but lost seven consecutive games leading up to the All-Star break. In August, the Rays lost seven games to finish out the month with an overall record of 84–51. The team concluded the season, albeit with a 13–14 record in September, by winning the American League East title for the first time in franchise history. As the Devil Rays, they had never finished with a winning record, nor finished higher than fourth in their division. The second-seeded Rays beat the Chicago White Sox 3–1 in the American League Division Series. In the American League Championship Series, Tampa Bay defeated the Boston Red Sox in 4–3, to advance to their first World Series in franchise history. The Rays became the third MLB team in the post-1969 "Divisional Era"  to make the World Series in their first trip to the playoffs, joining the 1969 New York Mets and the 1997 Florida Marlins.

Summary

† - Game suspended in the sixth inning due to rain.

Game summaries

Game 1

The national anthem was performed by Backstreet Boys. The Philadelphia Phillies scored the first runs of the Series when Chase Utley hit a home run with Jayson Werth on base in the top of the first inning. The Phillies loaded the bases in the second inning, but were unable to score when Shane Victorino was thrown out at home plate by B. J. Upton. The Tampa Bay Rays loaded the bases in the bottom of the third inning; however, Upton grounded into an inning-ending double play and the score remained 2–0. The Phillies extended their lead when Carlos Ruiz batted in Victorino in the fourth inning. In the bottom of the inning, a home run from Carl Crawford pulled the Rays within two runs. The Rays added their second run the following inning when a double by Akinori Iwamura scored Jason Bartlett. Tampa Bay starting pitcher Scott Kazmir was removed after six innings; J. P. Howell and Grant Balfour combined to shut out the Phillies for  innings. Ryan Madson relieved Phillies' starter Cole Hamels in the eighth inning, pitching a single perfect inning. In the top of the ninth inning, two Phillies' runners reached base. Tampa Bay's Trever Miller was brought on and threw four pitches—striking out Ryan Howard—before he was relieved. Philadelphia stranded two runners, on second and third base, and entered the bottom of the ninth inning ahead by one run. Philadelphia's Brad Lidge struck out the first two batters he faced and retired the third batter to get the save.

Game 2

The national anthem was performed by Los Lonely Boys. Tampa Bay scored the first runs of the game in the first inning when Akinori Iwamura and B. J. Upton scored on consecutive ground outs by Carlos Peña and Evan Longoria respectively. The following inning Upton singled, scoring Dioner Navarro. Rocco Baldelli attempted to score from second base, but was thrown out by right fielder Jayson Werth, keeping the Rays lead at 3–0. Cliff Floyd extended the Rays lead to four runs after leading off the bottom of the fourth inning with a single, advancing to third base, and scoring on a Jason Bartlett sacrifice bunt. Rays starter James Shields shut out the Phillies through  innings to earn the win, before being relieved by Dan Wheeler who pitched an additional scoreless inning. Philles starter Brett Myers lasted seven innings, giving up four runs (three earned) and took the loss. Eric Bruntlett hit a home run in the top of the eighth inning to bring the score to 4–1. The Phillies added a second run in the top of the ninth inning against David Price, but were unable to score any more runs; Tampa Bay's win tied the Series at one game apiece.

Game 3

Steve Carlton threw out the Ceremonial First pitch while Taylor Swift sang the national anthem. The third game of the Series was delayed for an hour and 31 minutes because of rain. Country music star Tim McGraw, son of Phillies reliever Tug McGraw, spread his father's ashes on the pitching mound of Citizens Bank Park, prior to the game's start. The Phillies scored in the bottom of the first inning after Jimmy Rollins led off with a single and eventually scored when Chase Utley grounded out. In the next half inning, Tampa Bay's Carl Crawford doubled, stole third base and scored on a Gabe Gross sacrifice fly to center field. Carlos Ruiz gave the Phillies their second lead of the night when he hit a home run in the bottom of the second inning. Starting pitchers Matt Garza and Jamie Moyer pitched six and  innings respectively. The 2–1 score remained unchanged until the sixth inning when Chase Utley and Ryan Howard hit the 14th back-to-back home runs in World Series history. Crawford scored his second run of the game in the top of the seventh inning when he was batted in by Gross again. Dioner Navarro continued the rally by scoring on a Jason Bartlett ground out—bringing the score to 4–3. In the top of the eighth inning, B.J. Upton led off with a single, stole second and third, and scored on a throwing error by catcher Carlos Ruiz to tie the game. Eric Bruntlett was hit by a pitch by J.P. Howell leading off the bottom of the ninth, moved to second on a wild pitch and to third on a throwing error. Tampa Bay intentionally walked the next two batters, Shane Victorino and pinch hitter Greg Dobbs to load the bases, creating a force play at the plate. They then brought the infield in (including right fielder Ben Zobrist who was brought in to be a fifth infielder) and replaced Howell with Grant Balfour hoping to convert any groundball into a force out at home and preventing the game winning run. However, Bruntlett scored the winning run on Ruiz's 45-foot infield single. The infield single was fielded by third baseman Evan Longoria who threw desperately to the plate in an attempt to save a run. However, any hope of an out vanished as the throw missed Navarro and Bruntlett scored (it would not be counted as an error). Ruiz's walk-off infield single was the first walk-off infield single in World Series history, giving the Phillies a 2–1 lead in the series.
Phillies reliever J. C. Romero earned the win and Howell took the loss.

Game 4

Robin Roberts threw out the Ceremonial First pitch while Patti LaBelle sang the national anthem. Philadelphia took a 1–0 lead in the bottom of the first inning, as Jimmy Rollins led off with a double and scored when Pat Burrell later walked with the bases loaded. The Phillies doubled their lead in the third inning when Chase Utley reached base on a fielding error and scored on Pedro Feliz's single. The Rays scored their first run when Carl Crawford hit a solo home run in the top of the fourth inning. Ryan Howard's three-run home run in the bottom of the inning brought the score to 5–1. Tampa Bay's Eric Hinske hit a pinch-hit home run to bring the Rays within three runs, but Phillies pitcher Joe Blanton responded with a home run of his own to re-extend the lead to four; it was the first time a pitcher hit a home run in the World Series since Ken Holtzman in game 4 of the 1974 World Series. Blanton pitched six innings, giving up two runs on four hits to acquire his first win of the Series. Jayson Werth hit a two-run home run in the eighth inning—the Phillies' third of the game—to bring the score to 8–2. Later in the inning, Ryan Howard's second home run, and fifth RBI, increased the Phillies' lead to eight runs. Philadelphia's four relief pitchers combined for three shutout innings, giving up one hit. Due to the late completion of the previous game, Games 3 and 4 each ended on the same calendar day.

Game 5

The national anthem was sung by John Oates. Philadelphia scored in the first inning for the third consecutive game, taking a 2–0 lead when Shane Victorino batted in Jayson Werth and Chase Utley. Tampa Bay cut the lead in half in the fourth inning; Carlos Peña doubled and was batted in on Evan Longoria's single, both players' first hits of the Series. The Rays then tied the game in the sixth inning when B. J. Upton scored from second base on a Peña single.

The game was suspended after the top of the sixth inning because of rain, making it the first game in World Series history not to be played through to completion or declared a tie. Phillies starter Cole Hamels, making his fifth start, had pitched six innings when the umpires suspended play. The Phillies pinch hit for Hamels in the bottom of the sixth inning. By retaking the lead in that half-inning, the Phillies put Hamels in line for the victory, which would have been his fifth win in the postseason, tying an MLB record. However, when Tampa Bay again tied the game in the seventh, Hamels was left with a no decision.

After the game was suspended, umpiring crew chief Tim Tschida told reporters that he and his crew ordered the players off the field because the wind and rain threatened to make the game "comical." Chase Utley agreed, saying that by the middle of the sixth inning, "the infield was basically under water." Rain continued to fall in Philadelphia on Tuesday, further postponing the game to Wednesday, October 29.

The game resumed with the Phillies batting in the bottom of the sixth inning. Pinch hitter Geoff Jenkins led off with a double and was bunted to third by Rollins. Jayson Werth then batted in Jenkins to take the lead for the Phillies, 3–2. In the top of the seventh inning, Rocco Baldelli re-tied the game at three runs with a solo home run. Later in the inning, Utley faked a throw to first, then threw Bartlett out at home for the third out in a play later described as having saved the Series for the Phillies. In the bottom of the seventh, Pat Burrell led off with a double for his only hit of the series off pitcher J. P. Howell. Eric Bruntlett, pinch-running for Burrell, scored on a single by Pedro Feliz to put the Phillies up by a run again, 4–3. This gave Howell his second relief loss. In the top of the ninth, Brad Lidge gave up a single to Dioner Navarro and a stolen base to pinch runner Fernando Perez, but was able to strike out Eric Hinske to secure the World Series for the Phillies. Phillies reliever J. C. Romero got his second win of the Series.

The Phillies won the Series despite committing at least one error in each game.  This game also marked only the second time in MLB history that first-inning runs were scored in each of the first five games played in a World Series (it had previously occurred in 2003).

Implications of the suspension

Under normal conditions, games are considered to be official games after five innings, or four and a half if the home team is leading at that point. However, post-season games are operated by the Commissioner's Office, thus are subject to the Commissioner's discretion of how to handle the scheduling of the games. So, with rain in the forecast for Philadelphia, Commissioner Bud Selig informed both the Rays and the Phillies management before the game began that a team would not be allowed to clinch the Series in a rain-shortened game.

Because of the rainfall, Game 5 was suspended after the top of the sixth inning. Rain continued to fall in Philadelphia on Tuesday, October 28, and the game ultimately resumed on Wednesday, October 29, at Citizens Bank Park. Official MLB records and statistics for a suspended game reflect the start date of the contest; October 27 for this game.

This was the first game in World Series history to be suspended. There had been three tied games in the history of the World Series: 1907, 1912, and 1922, all of them called due to darkness. In general, no ties would be needed under modern rules, which provide for suspension of a tied game and resumption of it at the next possible date. Weather has caused numerous delays and postponements in Series history (notable postponements beforehand coming in 1911, 1962, 1975, 1986, 1996 and 2006), but never any suspended games before 2008. Although not officially a suspended game, the longest postponement for a World Series was during the 1989 edition in which the start of Game 3 was delayed 10 days, due to the Loma Prieta earthquake striking the San Francisco Bay Area.

Several Nevada sports betting agencies treated the suspended game as a completed game and a win for the Phillies on Monday, October 27. Under Nevada house rules, the final score of a baseball game is determined by reverting to the last completed full inning, and the Phillies led 2–1 at the end of the fifth inning. Game 5 side bets on Philadelphia were paid off while bets on totals and run-line bets were refunded.

During the following offseason, Selig's interpretation of the rules became codified, as the 30 MLB club owners approved a rule change stipulating that all "postseason games and games added to the regular season to determine qualifiers for the postseason" become suspended games if they are called before nine innings are played, regardless of whether the game would otherwise qualify as an official game, or the score at the time the game is called. The game is resumed when conditions permit at the same location from the point of suspension. The first usage of that policy occurred during Game 1 of the 2011 ALDS, which was suspended after two innings because of rain and was resumed the following day.

Composite line score
2008 World Series (4–1): Philadelphia Phillies (NL) beat Tampa Bay Rays (AL).

Weather conditions
Games 3 and 5 of the World Series were delayed by rain storms in Philadelphia, with the start of Game 3 on Saturday, October 25 being delayed an hour and 31 minutes (with that game ending at 1:47 am EDT on Sunday, October 26). Game 5, which began on Monday, October 27, was suspended after the top of the 6th inning and resumed Wednesday, October 29. Wet weather which affected Game 5 continued into Tuesday in the Philadelphia area, as Major League Baseball officials studied radar data to determine when Game 5 of the World Series would continue under conditions deemed "appropriate." Up to this point, there had never been a rain-shortened game in Series history, and this was the first suspension. As a result, had it been necessary to play them, Games 6 and 7 in St. Petersburg, originally scheduled for October 29 and 30, were postponed until a later date.

With temperatures plummeting towards  and with a cold rain falling at Citizens Bank Park, some of the Phillies and Rays players opted for an Elmer Fudd look, wearing specially made caps with built-in ear flaps. The caps, manufactured by New Era, were introduced during this year's spring training but were not used on the field until Game 5. New Era also supplied regular ball caps to both teams, which some players continued to wear despite the cold weather.

Broadcasting

The games were televised on Fox in the United States with Joe Buck and Tim McCarver (himself a former Phillies broadcaster) as booth announcers and Chris Myers and Ken Rosenthal as field reporters. Jeanne Zelasko hosted the pre-game and post-game show with Kevin Kennedy and Mark Grace (Games 1, 2) or Eric Karros (Games 3, 4, 5). Fox Sports en Español did the simulcast of the Series in Spanish-language with Ángel Torres, Miguel Morales and Cos Villa behind the microphones. Fox's broadcasts were also streamed online at MLB.com.

On radio, the Series was broadcast nationally by ESPN Radio with Jon Miller and Joe Morgan announcing, and a Spanish broadcast on ESPN Deportes Radio. Locally, Dave Wills, Andy Freed, Dewayne Staats and Joe Magrane called the Series in English for the Rays on WHNZ-AM in Tampa, with Ricardo Tavaras and Enrique Oliu working the Spanish broadcast on St. Petersburg's WGES-AM. Harry Kalas, Scott Franzke, Larry Andersen, and Chris Wheeler called the Phillies' English broadcasts on WPHT-AM in Philadelphia, with Spanish announcers Danny Martinez, Bill Kulik and Juan Ramos on WUBA. Following their contractual obligations, the non-flagship stations on the teams' radio networks carried the ESPN Radio broadcasts. MLB.com also carried the local radio broadcasts for online streaming, while XM Satellite Radio aired the local and national feeds to its subscribers. For Harry Kalas, this series brought together a father and son calling the series for different teams; his son Todd worked as a pregame announcer for the Rays, and joined his father in the WPHT booth for an inning of Game 1.

For international viewers, MLB International televised the game with commentators Rick Sutcliffe and Dave O'Brien. This feed was also carried to U.S. service personnel stationed around the globe via the American Forces Network.

This World Series win had significance for McCarver and Harry Kalas. McCarver was a backup commentator for Game of the Week on NBC, but he was not part of the network's Series announcing team. For Kalas, MLB radio-broadcasting regulations forbade local stations from producing live coverage of World Series games, instead forcing them to air the national CBS Radio feed of the games. Philadelphia fans were so outraged about this afterward that they started a letter-writing campaign to the Commissioner's Office, demanding a change to the rule. The following year, MLB amended its broadcasting contracts to allow World Series teams' flagship radio stations to air the games with local announcers, due at least in part to this outcry from Philadelphia fans. In 2008, both called the Phillies' World Series win.

Ratings

In both Nielsen ratings and total viewership, the 2008 World Series set record lows for worst in Major League Baseball's history. The 8.4 average Nielsen rating sank below the 10.1 record set two years earlier in 2006. 2008 bears the distinction of being the first World Series to draw lower than a 10.0. Game three's 6.1 rating also set a record, since surpassed, for the lowest rated individual game.

The low numbers may have been affected by factors beyond MLB's control. Game 3 was delayed one hour thirty-one minutes for weather and, consequently, ended at 1:47 am ET. Game 5 was also suspended after 5.5 innings and resumed two days later. These factors likely brought the ratings down.

In recent years, several World Series have surpassed 2008's ratings lows, forming a long-term trend of declining World Series ratings. The 2010 World Series also generated an 8.4, before the 2012 World Series set a fresh record low with 7.6 (though this was a sweep, which usually draws lower ratings). The 2014 World Series, 2018 World Series, and 2019 World Series finished with 8.2, 8.3, and 8.1 Nielsen averages respectively, all lower than 2008. The 2020 World Series, coming after a season shortened by the COVID-19 pandemic, set the new record for lowest World Series ratings with a 5.2. The 2021 World Series received a 6.5 to hold the current spot for 2nd lowest ratings, with 2008's 8.4 now tied with 2010 for 7th lowest.

In total viewership, 2008 is now the fourth least watched World Series, with 2021, 2020, and 2012 all posting lower viewership numbers.

Umpiring

In Game 2, home plate umpire Kerwin Danley appealed a call to the first base umpire after calling strike three; the first base umpire called ball four to award the Rays' Rocco Baldelli a walk. Baldelli indicated that the calls did not come up in the locker room, and he did not believe they had an effect on the results.

In Game 3, Phillies' pitcher Jamie Moyer threw the ball to Ryan Howard to force out the Rays' Carl Crawford at first base, despite umpire Tom Hallion calling Crawford safe in the game. In Game 4, Evan Longoria tagged Rollins at third base, though umpire Tim Welke had ruled Rollins safe. The league admitted these errors between Games 4 and 5.

Impact and aftermath

Phillies

The Phillies' second World Series championship brought about a series of firsts, not just for them, but for Philadelphia. In winning their first championship since , the Phillies brought the city of Philadelphia its first major professional sports championship since the 76ers swept the 1983 NBA Finals, breaking the alleged Curse of Billy Penn.

In summing up the firsts and given how long the city's sports fans have waited, Phillies President David Montgomery said that "our first name is Philadelphia", and he and manager Charlie Manuel dedicated the championship to the city of Philadelphia and the fans. Manuel also dedicated the championship to his mother, who died on the day of Game 2 of the NLCS. Phil Sheridan of The Philadelphia Inquirer said that the 25 years without a championship "helped define this city as a sports town for way too long. It was long enough to turn passion too often to anger. Maybe this championship will turn the vinegar back into wine," and said that the fans "waited forever and a day."

On Halloween, October 31, approximately two million fans lined Broad Street for a ticker-tape parade, making it the largest gathering for a championship parade in Philadelphia since the Flyers won the 1974 Stanley Cup Finals. This parade had significance for Phillies pitcher Jamie Moyer and Phillies broadcaster Harry Kalas, as they both were at the 1980 parade. Moyer grew up in the Philadelphia area as a Phillies fan and whose childhood hero was Steve Carlton, a member of the 1980 team, and whom he won against in his first Major League start. He was at both of the Phillies' World Series parades, skipping school to attend in 1980, and as a pitcher in 2008. Kalas was at both parades, as a broadcaster for the Phillies. When comparing the parade to the one in 1980, he told WCAU-TV that "this is bigger...the biggest I've ever seen."

In 2010, Philadelphia sports fans picked both of the Phillies' World Series wins as the two greatest moments in Philadelphia sports, picking the 2008 championship as the greatest moment.

During that season they finished first in the National League East with a 93–69 mark, and eliminated the Rockies and the Dodgers in the NL playoffs. They would lose to the Yankees in six games.

Subsequent regular season meetings between the Rays and the Phillies would be relatively uncommon. The Rays only visited Philadelphia twice within the next seven years (in 2012 and 2015).

This would be the last professional sports championship for the city of Philadelphia until the Philadelphia Eagles defeated the New England Patriots 41–33 in Super Bowl LII in 2018.

Rays
For the Rays, at the same time the ticker-tape parade went down Broad Street in Philadelphia, thousands of Rays' fans attended a rally at Straub Park in St. Petersburg, celebrating their 2008 season.

Mayor Rick Baker said that the rally "really needed to be done. There was so much demand in the community. They didn't win the World Series but they won the AL. And we want to celebrate that and thank them." He and Tampa Mayor Pam Iorio addressed the fans during the rally.

Though the Rays missed the playoffs in 2009, they earned a winning record of 84–78, placing them third behind the Red Sox and eventual champion Yankees. From 2010-2013, the Rays won at least 90 games each season, a remarkable feat for a team with one of the lowest payrolls in baseball. The 2008 Rays were covered in depth in the book The Extra 2%: How Wall Street Strategies Took a Major League Baseball Team from Worst to First by Jonah Keri.

Several Rays players from 2008 later won a World Series with other teams. Jonny Gomes, who was not on the Rays' postseason roster, played on the Boston Red Sox's  championship team.

See also

2008 Asia Series
2008 Japan Series
2007 Korean Series

References
Inline citations

Bibliography

External links

ESPN - MLB Playoffs - 2008 World Series - Tampa Bay Rays vs. Philadelphia Phillies
Phillies Championship page

World Series
World Series
Tampa Bay Rays postseason
Philadelphia Phillies postseason
World Series
World Series
Baseball competitions in Philadelphia
2008 in Philadelphia
Baseball competitions in St. Petersburg, Florida
21st century in St. Petersburg, Florida
October 2008 sports events in the United States